Firuzabad (also Romanized as Fīrūzābād) is a village in Sanjabad-e Jonubi Rural District of Firuz District, Kowsar County, Ardabil province, Iran. At the 2006 census, its population was 319 in 83 households. The following census in 2011 counted 400 people in 110 households. The latest census in 2016 showed a population of 489 people in 132 households; it was the largest village in its rural district.

References 

Kowsar County

Towns and villages in Kowsar County

Populated places in Ardabil Province

Populated places in Kowsar County